The 2015 IIHF World Championship Division I was an international ice hockey tournament run by the International Ice Hockey Federation. Group A was contested in Kraków, Poland, after the original host, Donetsk, Ukraine, withdrew, from 19 to 25 April 2015 and Group B was held in Eindhoven, Netherlands, from 13 to 19 April 2015.

In Group A Kazakhstan finished first, winning their group in Division I for the fourth time in their last four appearances, thereby securing promotion to the 2016 World Championship. Hungary surprised and placed second, defeating host Poland in the final game to secure promotion; it was the first time Hungary earned promotion to the top division since 2009, and only the second time since 1939. Ukraine finished last in the group and was relegated to Group B for 2016.

Group B saw South Korea finish first and win promotion. Great Britain finished second, losing out on first and promotion with a loss to Lithuania in the final game of the tournament. Host Netherlands ended the tournament in last place and was relegated to Division II A for the next year.

Venues

Division I A

Participants

Match officials
7 referees and 7 linesmen were selected for the tournament.

Referees
 Andris Ansons
 Péter Gebei
 René Hradil
 Daniel Konc
 Marcus Linde
 Viki Trilar
 Marc Wiegand

Linesman
 Andrew Dalton
 Dmitri Golyak
 Matjaž Hribar
 Rene Jensen
 Wojciech Moszczyński
 Tibor Rovenský
 Alexander Waldejer

Standings

Results
All times are local (UTC+2).

Awards and statistics

Awards

Best players selected by the directorate:
 Best Goalkeeper:  Przemysław Odrobny
 Best Defenseman:  Kevin Dallman
 Best Forward:  Roman Starchenko
Source: IIHF.com

Media All-Stars:
 MVP:  Roman Starchenko
 Goalkeeper:  Pavel Poluektov
 Defenceman:  Kevin Dallman /  Mateusz Rompkowski
 Forwards:  Roman Starchenko /  Andrew Sarauer /  Marcin Kolusz
Source: IIHF.com

Scoring leaders
List shows the top skaters sorted by points, then goals.

GP = Games played; G = Goals; A = Assists; Pts = Points; +/− = Plus/minus; PIM = Penalties in minutes; POS = Position
Source: IIHF.com

Goaltending leaders
Only the top five goaltenders, based on save percentage, who have played at least 40% of their team's minutes, are included in this list.

TOI = Time on Ice (minutes:seconds); SA = Shots against; GA = Goals against; GAA = Goals against average; Sv% = Save percentage; SO = Shutouts
Source: IIHF.com

Division I B

Participants

Match officials
4 referees and 7 linesmen were selected for the tournament.

Referees
 Jacob Grumsen
 Jeff Ingram
 Anssi Salonen
 Shane Warschaw

Linesmen
 Louis Beelen
 Marek Hlavatý
 Frederic Monnaie
 Pasi Nieminen
 Ulrich Pardatscher
 David Perduv
 Sotaro Yamaguchi

Standings

Results
All times are local (UTC+2).

Awards and statistics

Awards
Best players selected by the directorate:
 Best Goalkeeper:  Mantas Armalis
 Best Defenseman:  Ben O'Connor
 Best Forward:  Lee Yong-jun
Source: IIHF.com

Scoring leaders
List shows the top skaters sorted by points, then goals.

GP = Games played; G = Goals; A = Assists; Pts = Points; +/− = Plus/minus; PIM = Penalties in minutes; POS = Position
Source: IIHF.com

Goaltending leaders
Only the top five goaltenders, based on save percentage, who have played at least 40% of their team's minutes, are included in this list.

TOI = Time on Ice (minutes:seconds); SA = Shots against; GA = Goals against; GAA = Goals against average; Sv% = Save percentage; SO = Shutouts
Source: IIHF.com

References

IIHF World Championship Division I
2
2015
2015 IIHF World Championship Division I
2015 IIHF World Championship Division I
World
World
2015 IIHF World Championship Division I
2015 IIHF World Championship Division I
21st century in Kraków
21st century in Eindhoven
April 2015 sports events in Europe